Outside Providence may refer to:

 Outside Providence (novel), a 1988 novel by Peter Farrelly
 Outside Providence (film), a 1999 adaptation of the novel